DXBE (89.1 FM), broadcasting as Magic 89.1, is a radio station owned and operated by Quest Broadcasting Inc. and the partner station of Tiger 22 Media. Its studio and transmitter are located at the 6th Floor, Metrolifestyle Complex Bldg., E. Jacinto Ext. Cor. F. Torres St., Davao City. Amid the COVID-19 Pandemic, it operates Mondays to Saturdays from 6:00 AM to 8:00 PM and Sundays from 6:00 AM to 9:00 PM.

The station was formerly known as Killerbee 89.1 from its inception in 1991 until March 27, 2013. This station, along with the other Killerbee stations, were relaunched under the Magic moniker (adopted from its parent station) by April 29, 2013.

References

DXBE
Contemporary hit radio stations in the Philippines
Radio stations established in 1991
Quest Broadcasting